I Had Three Wives is an American comedy-drama television series that aired on CBS from August 14 to September 11, 1985. The series' lead was Victor Garber in his first starring role on television.

Plot 
The series follows Los Angeles-based "eternally romantic" private investigator Jackson Beaudine (Victor Garber) who leverages the skills of his three ex-wives to help solve cases. His first wife, Mary, who has remarried and who also has custody of Jackson's 10-year-old son Andrew, is a lawyer. Second wife, Samantha, is an actress with skills in disguise and martial arts. And his third wife, Liz, is a newspaper reporter with a number of useful contacts.

Cast

Main 

 Victor Garber as Jackson Beaudine
 Teri Copley as Samantha 
 Shanna Reed as Liz
 Maggie Cooper as Mary Beaudine Parker
 David Faustino as Andrew Beaudine

Recurring 
 Luis Avalos as Lt. Gomez

Production 
Six episodes were produced, but only five episodes were aired during summer 1985 as the pilot episode of the series was never aired. Bill Bixby was among those who directed an episode of the series. I Had Three Wives was one of four television shows that were part of an early experiment by CBS to program original series during summer.

Episodes

Reception 
Howard Rosenberg of Los Angeles Times reviewed I Had Three Wives negatively, calling the comedy/mystery series "...thin-plotted idiocy, a sort of citified Sleuths of Hazzard..." Rosenberg later reported that the series earned "weak ratings" during its summer run, which likely damaged its chances for renewal. The final episode of the series, aired on September 13, ranked 53rd for the week of September 9–15, 1985, earning a 10.5 rating.

References

External links 
 

1980s American comedy-drama television series
1985 American television series debuts
1985 American television series endings
Television shows set in Los Angeles
English-language television shows
CBS original programming
Television series by Warner Bros. Television Studios